Lambula errata is a moth of the family Erebidae. It was described by van Eecke in 1927. It is found on Sumatra and Borneo. The habitat consists of various lowland forest types.

References
Notes

Bibliography

Lithosiina
Moths described in 1927